Albert Robinson (born 1913, date of death unknown) was an English footballer who played for Mansfield Town.

References

1913 births
Year of death missing
English footballers
Association football defenders
English Football League players
Mansfield Town F.C. players